Tehov is a municipality and village in Benešov District in the Central Bohemian Region of the Czech Republic. It has about 300 inhabitants.

Administrative parts
Villages of Nemíž and Petříny are administrative parts of Tehov.

Gallery

References

Villages in Benešov District